(born March 14, 1970, in Hirosaki, Aomori, Japan) is a Japanese softball player.  She played in the Hitachi softball club from 1994 to 2006 and represented Japan as part of the Japan women's national softball team in the 1996, 2000, and 2004 Olympic Games. In 2000 and 2004, she played in the teams that won the bronze and silver medals, respectively.

Retirement 
Following her final Olympics appearance in 2004, Saitō continued at Hitachi softball club as a playing coach until 2006, when she became the coach for the national team. She led them to the gold medal at the 2008 Olympics. In 2011, national teammate, Reika Utsugi, succeeded her as the national team coach.

She currently serves as the technical vice chair on the Japan Softball Association. On 26 June, she was selected as a board director on the Japanese Olympic Committee (JOC), a move that doubled the number of women directors.

References

Japanese softball players
Living people
Softball players at the 2000 Summer Olympics
Olympic softball players of Japan
Olympic silver medalists for Japan
Softball players at the 2004 Summer Olympics
Olympic bronze medalists for Japan
Softball players at the 1996 Summer Olympics
1970 births
Olympic medalists in softball
People from Hirosaki
Medalists at the 2004 Summer Olympics
Asian Games medalists in softball
Softball players at the 1994 Asian Games
Softball players at the 1998 Asian Games
Softball players at the 2002 Asian Games
Medalists at the 1994 Asian Games
Medalists at the 1998 Asian Games
Medalists at the 2002 Asian Games
Asian Games gold medalists for Japan
Asian Games silver medalists for Japan
21st-century Japanese women
20th-century Japanese women